Pavel Zhitkov (born June 4, 1984) is a Kazakhstani retired ice hockey goaltender who last played for Kulager Petropavl in the Kazakhstan Hockey Championship league. He participated at the 2010 IIHF World Championship as a member of the Kazakhstan men's national ice hockey team, appearing in one game.

References

External links

Living people
Sportspeople from Karaganda
Arlan Kokshetau players
Arystan Temirtau players
Bulat Temirtau players
HC Almaty players
Kazakhmys Satpaev players
Kazakhstani ice hockey goaltenders
1984 births
Competitors at the 2011 Winter Universiade